Dan Bronchinson is a French actor and producer.

Biography
Bronchinson is the lead actor in and the producer of the film Dealer (fr), directed by Jean Luc Herbulot. The screenplay was inspired by Bronchinson’s life as a former drug dealer. The film premiered at the Fantasia International Film Festival in Canada and opened the Étrange Festival in Paris.

He features as one of the leads in the short film Alien Grounds based on the music of the French rock band Mars Red Sky.

Filmography
 Addiction (2011)
 Routine (2012)
 Dealer (2014)
 Alien Grounds (2016)

References

External links
 

Living people
French male film actors
French producers
Year of birth missing (living people)